Russia High School  (roo-shee) is a public high school in Russia, Ohio.  It is the only high school in the Russia Local School district.

The Raiders wear royal blue and gold while they compete in the Shelby County Athletic League.

Ohio High School Athletic Association State Championships
 Boys Baseball – 1971, 2022

State baseball runner ups- 1975,2017

State  boys basketball runner up-2002

References

External links
 District Website

High schools in Shelby County, Ohio
Public high schools in Ohio